A commuting zone is a geographic area used in population and economic analysis. In addition to the major use of urban areas, it may be used to define rural areas which share a common market.

According to the Economic Research Service of the United States Department of Agriculture:

See also
 Commuter town
 Daily urban system
 Rural-urban commuting area
 Travel to work area

Notes and references

External links and further reading
"Labor Market areas for the United States"
"U.S Commuting Zones and Labor Market Areas: A 1990 Update"

Demographics